Darko Kremenović (born 5 June 1981) is a Slovenian footballer who plays for Izola as a forward.

Career

China
Kremenović joined Henan Jianye in February 2007. He was described as displaying the qualities of an archetypal European professional footballer. However, he performed mediocrely in the first two rounds, and was then benched for a series of matches.

Kazakhstan
Preparing with Zhetysu partway through January 2011, Kremenović made six league appearances for the team, but never made it into the main lineup. His contract expired that summer.

References

External links 
NZS profile 
ÖFB profile 
Soccerway profile

1981 births
Living people
Slovenian footballers
Association football forwards
ND Gorica players
NK Brda players
FC Koper players
Henan Songshan Longmen F.C. players
NK Ivančna Gorica players
NK Zagorje players
ND Mura 05 players
NK Primorje players
FC Zhetysu players
Slovenian PrvaLiga players
Slovenian Second League players
Kazakhstan Premier League players
Slovenian expatriate footballers
Slovenian expatriate sportspeople in China
Expatriate footballers in China
Slovenian expatriate sportspeople in Austria
Expatriate footballers in Austria
Expatriate footballers in Kazakhstan
Slovenian expatriate sportspeople in Italy
Expatriate footballers in Italy
Slovenian expatriate sportspeople in France
Expatriate footballers in France
Slovenia youth international footballers